Dysspastus undecimpunctella is a moth of the family Autostichidae. It is found in Croatia, Albania, North Macedonia, Greece and Turkey.

References

Moths described in 1864
Dysspastus
Moths of Europe
Moths of Asia